Sylvester Emmanuel (born 4 April 1998) is a Nigerian tennis player.

Emmanuel has a career high ATP singles ranking of 1097 achieved on 12 December 2016. He also has a career high ATP doubles ranking of 867, achieved on 19 June 2017. Emmanuel hasn't won ITF title.
 
Emmanuel has represented Nigeria at Davis Cup, where he has a win-loss record of 13–7.

Future and Challenger finals

Doubles 1 (0–1)

Davis Cup

Participations: (13–7)

   indicates the outcome of the Davis Cup match followed by the score, date, place of event, the zonal classification and its phase, and the court surface.

* Walkover doesn't count in his overall record.

Record against other players

Emmanuel's match record against players who have been ranked in the top 100, with those who are active in boldface. 
ATP Tour, Challenger and Future tournaments' main draw and qualifying matches are considered.

References

External links 
 
 
 

1998 births
Living people
Nigerian male tennis players
Competitors at the 2019 African Games
African Games competitors for Nigeria
21st-century Nigerian people